Saby Natonga (1970) is a Vanuatuan professional football manager and the current Vice President of the Vanuatu Football Federation. In 1996 and from July 2011 to May 2012 he was coach of the Vanuatu national football team.

References

External links
Profile at Soccerway.com
Profile at Soccerpunter.com
 Part  of book of Eric WITTERSHEIM about Vanuatu independence

Year of birth missing (living people)
Living people
Vanuatuan football managers
Vanuatu national football team managers
Place of birth missing (living people)